Acromantis hesione, common name Burmese mantis, is a species of praying mantis found in China and the Philippines.

See also
List of mantis genera and species

References

Hesione
Mantodea of Asia
Mantodea of Southeast Asia
Insects of China
Insects of the Philippines
Insects described in 1877